Sukhen Dey may refer to:

 Sukhen Dey (footballer)
 Sukhen Dey (weightlifter)